The 1998 Barber Dodge Pro Series season was the thirteenth season of the series. For this season the Dodge powered Reynard 98E was introduced. Michelin had become the sole tyre supplier.

Race calendar and results

Final standings

References

Barber Dodge Pro Series
1998 in American motorsport